"Juice Wrld Did" is a song by American producer DJ Khaled featuring American rapper Juice WRLD from the former's thirteenth studio album God Did (2022). It was produced by Nick Mira and DT of Internet Money Records.

Critical reception
The song received generally positive reviews from critics. Andy Kellman of AllMusic wrote, "the wobbling/chiming track is among the album's few other memorable moments despite being dusted off and slapped into the sequence after Khaled added his vocal stamp. Its bittersweet quality is strongest when Juice, who died in 2019, declares himself rookie of the year." Ben Brutocao of HipHopDX stated, "JUICE WRLD DID" is one of the most natural posthumous tracks this year, and reminds everyone that we lost a generational talent, which is a reminder that no one needed, but everyone could use." Writing for Pitchfork, Dani Blum commented, "the late Juice WRLD shines on a track that's just him". HotNewHipHop Robert Blair wrote of the song, "Performed by a charged and almost agonizingly vibrant Juice WRLD, his verses show off his sheer lyrical aptitude and his mastery of flow that he often divulged during radio show freestyles while the intricate Nick Mira production feels as organic."

Robin Murray of Clash had a less favorable reaction to the song, writing, "'Juice WRLD DID' is a short piece, a fond tribute to the late rapper; the actual recording is insubstantial though, while smothering Juice WRLD's delivery in his 'DJ KHALED!!!!' cypher isn't the most subtle of moves."

Charts

References

2022 songs
DJ Khaled songs
Juice Wrld songs
Songs released posthumously
Songs written by DJ Khaled
Songs written by Juice Wrld
Songs written by Nick Mira